KTM 450 Rally is a rally raid bike, produced from 2011 with the specific task of winning the Dakar Rally, that has won nine times in eleven participations.

Model Progression
The first generation of the 450 Rally was essentially a 690 Rally with a 450 engine due to a late rule change for the 2011 Dakar Rally. 

For model year 2014 the bike was totally redesigned making it lighter, slimmer, and better handling than the previous generation.

2019 bought further changes to overall improve weight distribution including a new swingarm, linkage, and shock absorber with a new airbox, fuel tanks, and seat. There were also changes to the Akrapovic exhaust making it shorter and lower as well as increased power coming from a revised cylinder head, new fuel injection system, and new transmission.

Rally Dakar podium

See also
 KTM 950 Super Enduro R

References

External links
 Bike specs at Redbull.com

Off-road motorcycles
Motorcycles introduced in 2011
Rally raid bikes
450 Rally